Kustavi is a municipality of Finland. It is in the province of Western Finland and is part of the Southwest Finland region.

There are over 2,000 isles within the municipal area. The municipality is a very popular summer resort and contains over 2,800 summer cottages. The population increases tenfold during the summer months. The larger events are Volter Kilpi literature week in July and Salmon market (Lohimarkkinat) in August. The basic services in the municipality include three groceries, a liquor store, a library and a bank. There are two ferry connections to Brändö and Iniö.

The municipality is unilingually Finnish even though it is located adjacent to the Swedish speaking Åland-region. The municipality is named after King Gustav III of Sweden.

References

External links

Municipality of Kustavi – Official website

Municipalities of Southwest Finland
Populated coastal places in Finland
Populated places established in 1874
Finnish islands in the Baltic
1874 establishments in Finland